The Henry Smeltzer Farmstead is a historic home and farm complex located near Middletown, Frederick County, Maryland, United States. It includes a two-story six-bay brick farmhouse dating to about 1832, a frame bank barn ruin, and several rusticated concrete block silos. A concrete block slaughter house, weighing house well house and holding pens complete the complex, which was associated in the early and mid-twentieth century with Main's Meats in Middletown. The house is built into the hillside as a "bank house", with its cellar above grade on the south side. The front and rear elevations feature porches across their widths.

The Henry Smeltzer Farmstead was listed on the National Register of Historic Places in 2010.

References

External links
 at Maryland Historical Trust

Houses on the National Register of Historic Places in Maryland
Federal architecture in Maryland
Houses completed in 1832
Houses in Frederick County, Maryland
National Register of Historic Places in Frederick County, Maryland